SBK 2011: Superbike World Championship is a motorcycle racing game, and the fifth installment of the SBK series developed by Milestone srl and published by Black Bean Games. The game features all the riders of the 2011 Superbike World Championship and the teams and riders of the 2010 Supersport World Championship season and Superstock 1000 championship of 2010 just like SBK X: Superbike World Championship. The game had a high reception of 8/10 on IGN, and as the 2010 title, it has an arcade and simulation mode with all the realistic motorbike settings, whilst the arcade has no realism and even slows the bike down off track.

External

2011 video games
Windows games
Xbox 360 games
PlayStation 3 games
Superbike World Championship video games
Multiplayer and single-player video games
Milestone srl games
Video games developed in Italy
Black Bean Games games